Michigan Jake was a barbershop quartet that formed in 1995. The quartet borrowed the name from Michigan J. Frog,  the singing frog in the 1955 Merrie Melodies short One Froggy Evening.

The original line-up comprised the section leaders of the Louisville Times chorus of Louisville, Kentucky. After a few changes in the line-up, Michigan Jake won the 2001 International Quartet Contest in Nashville. They announced their retirement on July 1, 2004.

They will long be remembered for their innovative style, distinctive and natural approach to singing and their amazing understanding of swing rhythms.

Additional highlights of their career:

5 April 2001 – Michigan Jake is the winner of two Contemporary A Cappella Recording Awards! Beginning to See the Light won best barbershop song of 2000, while For the Record was runner-up for best barbershop album of 2000.

4 October 2001 – Michigan Jake is the winner of a Harmony Award from the Vocal Group Hall of Fame, presented in Sharon, PA. Other 2001 recipients include the Lettermen, the Lennon Sisters, the Chordettes, the Four Freshmen, the Eagles and the Pied Pipers. Michigan Jake is the first barbershop quartet to receive this award.

4 July 2002 – Michigan Jake appears live on "In Search of America", a three-hour 4th of July special hosted by Peter Jennings on ABC TV. Other performers include Alicia Keys, Hank Williams, Jr., Sheryl Crow, and Wynton Marsalis. The quartet performed Camptown Races and Dinah in a three-minute segment.

Discography
 For the Record (CD/cassette; 2000)
 How Rhythm Was Born (CD; 2004)

They also appear on Steppin Out with the Louisville Times Chorus (CD, cassette).

External links
 Official website
 AIC entry

Barbershop Harmony Society
Barbershop quartets
Musical groups established in 1995
Musical groups disestablished in 2004
Professional a cappella groups